"A Friend in California" is a song written by Freddy Powers, and recorded by American country music artist Merle Haggard backed by The Strangers.  It was released in May 1986 as the second single and title track from the album A Friend in California.  The song reached number 9 on the Billboard Hot Country Singles & Tracks chart.

Personnel
Merle Haggard– vocals, guitar, fiddle

The Strangers:
Roy Nichols – guitar
Norman Hamlet – steel guitar, dobro
Clint Strong – guitar
Mark Yeary – keyboards
Dennis Hromek – bass
Biff Adam – drums
Jimmy Belken – fiddle
Don Markham – trumpet, saxophone
Gary Church – trombone, trumpet
Donna Faye Harman - Background Vocals

Chart performance

References

1986 singles
Merle Haggard songs
Epic Records singles
Songs written by Freddy Powers
1986 songs